Mâncio Lima is the westernmost municipality of Brazil and it is located in the state of Acre. It is also the northernmost city of that state. Its population is 19,311 and its area is 4,672 km². Its counterparts in the North, South and East are respectively Uiramutã, state of Roraima; Chuí, Rio Grande do Sul; and João Pessoa, the state capital of Paraíba.

The municipality contains 32% of the  Serra do Divisor National Park, created in 1989.

References

External links

Municipalities in Acre (state)
Populated places established in 1977